The Popran National Park is a protected national park that is located west of the M1 Pacific Motorway in the Central Coast region of New South Wales, in eastern Australia. The Park takes its name from Popran Creek which rises in the locality of Central Mangrove and then flows for approximately 24 km in a mostly southern direction until it reaches Mangrove Creek. Popran Creek flows through the Glenworth Valley, also known as the Popran Valley. The average elevation of the terrain is 135 meters.

The Aboriginal heritage is felt at every step, so a historical connection with this land cannot be avoided.

Various types of recreation are available here, from horse riding, mountain biking, fishing, picnicking and bird watching.

See also

 Protected areas of New South Wales
 Popran Valley
 Mangrove Creek (New South Wales)

References

External links
 
 
 

National parks of New South Wales
Protected areas established in 1994
1994 establishments in Australia
Hawkesbury River
Central Coast (New South Wales)